SpaceTEC® is one of the Advanced Technological Education (ATE) Centers funded by the National Science Foundation (NSF) for developing partnerships between academic institutions and industry partners to promote improvement in the education of science and engineering technicians at the undergraduate and secondary school levels. With an emphasis on two-year colleges, the ATE program focuses on the education of technicians for the high-technology fields that drive the world's economies.
Located in Cape Canaveral, Florida, SpaceTEC® supports the education and credentialing of aerospace technicians  in six core areas and three advanced disciplines: (1) space vehicle processing activities (2) aerospace manufacturing; and (3) composite materials.  A national consortium of community and technical colleges, universities, business and industry organizations, and government agencies promotes careers and educates candidates for technical employment.

The organization has been accredited by the International Certification Accreditation Council to ISO 17024 standards and offers performance-based examinations that result in industry-driven nationally recognized credentials that reflect the competencies employers demand. Successful candidates can qualify for college credits via transcripts provided by the American Council on Education. The SpaceTEC® national credentialing program has earned a formal Safety Approval by the U.S. Federal Aviation Administration's Office of Commercial Space Transportation.

History 

SpaceTEC® was established in 2002 as an NSF National Center of Excellence funded in part by a three-year NSF Advanced Technological Education Program grant and renewed in 2005 for an additional four years. SpaceTEC® was awarded a four-year follow-on grant in 2009 as an NSF National Resource Center, and in April, 2013, it received a four-year renewal of its NSF grant.  The center is now expanding operations to Science, technology, engineering, and mathematics (STEM fields) technicians working in technical fields beyond aerospace through its ‘’’CertTEC®’’’ commercial industry credentials.

The original consortium of industry, academia, and government representatives was known as the Community Colleges for Innovative Technology Transfer, a not-for-profit Florida corporation founded in 1994 to provide technician education for geographic information systems. Community Colleges for Innovative Technology Transfer received one of the first National Science Foundation grants for two-year community and technical colleges. The founding partners were all located near NASA or Department of Defense locations, providing a consortium strongly linked to post-secondary education programs for the nation's technical workforce in aerospace and defense. Its credentials are widely recognized in academic circles  as well as within the U. S. aerospace industry.

Community Colleges for Innovative Technology Transfer, was restructured in 2009 and renamed SpaceTEC Partners, Inc. (SPI). to reflect a growing expansion of activities to technical education programs beyond aerospace. The mission of SPI is to create and implement an industry-driven, government-endorsed, technical education process that be shared with other educational venues.  SpaceTEC® programs to educate and credential aerospace technicians have been adopted by educational institutions, NASA and Department of Defense contractors  and for U. S. active duty personnel and veterans.

Most recently, SpaceTEC® has obtained the NASA human spaceflight database of educational and credentialing activities for its NSF National Resource Center and all of its partners  and continues to support strong linkages between its industry and education partners.

References

External links 
 Official website of the SpaceTEC Aerospace Technical Education Center
 US Air Force Credentialing Web Site
 US Army Credentialing Opportunities On-Line 
 US Navy Credentialing Opportunities On-Line

Aerospace engineering organizations
Professional titles and certifications
Career and technical education
National Science Foundation